Mazatán or Mazatan may refer to:

Mazatán, Chiapas, Mexico
Mazatán, Sonora, Mexico
Mazatán Municipality, Sonora